Sir Francis Drummond Percy Chaplin  (10 August 1866 – 16 November 1933) served as administrator for the British South Africa Company in Southern Rhodesia from 1914 to 1923. He succeeded William Milton.

Chaplin, born in Twickenham in London, United Kingdom, attended Harrow School, and University College, University of Oxford.

References

1866 births
1933 deaths
British emigrants to Rhodesia
People from Twickenham
Rhodesian politicians
Zimbabwean people of English descent
Knights Grand Cross of the Order of the British Empire
Knights Commander of the Order of St Michael and St George
Alumni of University College, Oxford
People educated at Harrow School
Members of Lincoln's Inn